Izarne Sarasola Beain (born 17 February 2002) is a Spanish footballer who plays as a midfielder for Real Sociedad.

Club career
Sarasola started her career at Tolosa.

References

External links
Profile at La Liga

2002 births
Living people
Women's association football midfielders
Spanish women's footballers
Sportspeople from Gipuzkoa
Footballers from the Basque Country (autonomous community)
Real Sociedad (women) players
Primera División (women) players
People from Tolosaldea
Spain women's youth international footballers